Santa Fe is an unincorporated community in Butler Township, Miami County, in the U.S. state of Indiana.

History
Santa Fe was laid out in 1848. The community's name probably commemorates the Capture of Santa Fe in the Mexican–American War. A post office was established at Santa Fe in 1849, and remained in operation until 1917. The town is one of likely explanations for the town of same name in Spencer County becoming Santa Claus.

References

Unincorporated communities in Miami County, Indiana
Unincorporated communities in Indiana